The 2001–02 Slovak Cup was the 33rd season of Slovakia's annual knock-out cup competition and the ninth since the independence of Slovakia. It began on 25 July 2001 with Preliminary round and ended on 8 May 2002 with the Final. The winners of the competition earned a place in the qualifying round of the UEFA Cup. Inter Bratislava were the defending champions.

Preliminary round
The first legs were played on 25 and 26 July 2001. The second legs were played on 2 August 2001.

|}

First round
The ten games were played on 18 September 2001 and the six games were played on 2 and 3 October 2001.

|}

Second round
The seven games were played on 9 October 2001 and the match SH Senica – Ozeta Dukla Trenčín was played on 10 October 2001.

|}

Quarter-finals
The games were played on 23 October 2001.

|}

Semi-finals
The first legs were played on 19 March 2002. The second legs were played on 9 April 2002.

|}

Final

References

External links
profutbal.sk 
Results on RSSSF

Slovak Cup seasons
Slovak Cup
Cup